Appias, commonly called puffins or albatrosses, is a genus of butterflies in the subfamily Pierinae (whites) found in Africa and southern Asia.

Species
Listed alphabetically:
Appias ada (Stoll, [1781]) – rare albatross
Appias aegis (Felder, C & R Felder, 1861) – forest white
Appias albina (Boisduval, 1836) – common albatross or white albatross
Appias aroa (Ribbe, 1900)
Appias athama (Blanchard, 1848)
Appias caeca Corbet, 1941
Appias cardena (Hewitson, [1861])
Appias celestina (Boisduval, 1832) – common migrant
Appias clementina (Felder, C, 1860)
Appias dolorosa Fruhstorfer, 1910
Appias drusilla (Cramer, [1777]) – Florida white or tropical white
Appias epaphia (Cramer, [1779]) – diverse albatross or African albatross
Appias galene (Felder, C & R Felder, 1865)
?Appias hero (Fabricius, 1793)
Appias hombroni (Lucas, 1852)
Appias inanis van Eecke, 1913
Appias indra (Moore, 1857) – plain puffin
Appias ithome (C. & R. Felder, 1859)
Appias lalage (Doubleday, 1842) – spot puffin
Appias lalassis Grose-Smith, 1887
Appias lasti (Grose-Smith, 1889) – Last's albatross
Appias leis (Geyer, [1832])
Appias libythea (Fabricius, 1775) – striped albatross
Appias lyncida (Cramer, [1777]) – chocolate albatross
Appias maria (Semper, 1875)
Appias mata Kheil, 1884
Appias melania (Fabricius, 1775) – grey albatross
Appias nephele Hewitson, [1861]
Appias nero (Fabricius, 1793) – orange albatross
Appias nupta (Fruhstorfer, 1897)
Appias olferna Swinhoe, 1890 – eastern striped albatross
Appias panda Fruhstorfer, 1903 – Nicobar albatross
Appias pandione (Geyer, [1832])
Appias paulina (Cramer, [1777]) – Ceylon lesser albatross or white albatross
Appias perlucens (Butler, 1898)
Appias phaola (Doubleday, 1847) – dirty albatross or Congo white
Appias phoebe (C. & R. Felder, 1861) 
Appias placidia (Stoll, [1790])
Appias punctifera d'Almeida, 1939
Appias remedios Schröder & Treadaway, 1990
Appias sabina (C. & R. Felder, [1865]) – Sabine albatross or albatross white
Appias sylvia (Fabricius, 1775) – woodland white or common albatross
Appias waltraudae Schröder, 1977
Appias wardii (Moore, 1884) – lesser albatross
Appias zarinda (Boisduval, 1836) – eastern orange albatross

References

External links
Images representing Appias at EOL

 
Pieridae genera
Taxa named by Jacob Hübner
Pierini